Acoustic Hymns Vol 1 is the sixth studio album by English singer and musician Richard Ashcroft. The album was released on 29 October 2021 through Righteous Phonographic Association and BMG Rights Management. Ashcroft's longtime collaborator Chris Potter returned for production duties after not being involved on the previous album Natural Rebel. The album consists of new versions of songs from Ashcroft's back catalogue, spanning both his solo career and his time with the Verve, mainly from 1997's Urban Hymns. The album debuted at number two on the UK Albums Chart, Ashcroft's highest chart position since 2006's Keys to the World.

Background
This project started after the COVID-19 pandemic was over, bringing Ashcroft's regular collaborators together again. Some of the songs maintained their original arrangements, while other songs took on new approaches. The album was produced by Ashcroft with regular collaborator Chris Potter. It featured his regular live band with some special collaborators. Wil Malone provided the string arrangements, recorded at Abbey Road Studios. Chuck Leavell (The Allman Brothers, The Rolling Stones) performed piano, Roddy Bloomfield lead the brass section and Steve Wyreman contributed with acoustic guitar and backing vocals. Liam Gallagher provides co-lead vocals on "C'mon People (We're Making It Now)".

Track listing

Charts

References

2021 albums
Richard Ashcroft albums
Albums produced by Chris Potter (record producer)
BMG Rights Management albums